Queensway (foaled 1929 in Ontario) was a Canadian Thoroughbred racehorse who in 1932 won the three races that would years later officially be designated as the Canadian Triple Crown.

The chestnut filly was owned and bred by Robert W. R. Cowie and trained by Harry Giddings, Jr. Her jockey at the time of her three 1932 major wins was Frankie Mann.
 
Queensway had 52 starts, which included 12 wins, 8 places and 4 shows. Her career earnings were $16,811.

In 2003, she was inducted into the Canadian Horse Racing Hall of Fame.

Pedigree

See also
 List of historical horses

References

1929 racehorse births
Racehorses bred in Ontario
Racehorses trained in Canada
King's Plate winners
Triple Crown of Thoroughbred Racing winners
Canadian Horse Racing Hall of Fame inductees
Thoroughbred family 14-a